TsNIITochMash is a Russian industrial design bureau which is a major designer and producer of weapons for the Russian military and MVD National Guard. The name is an initialism for Central Scientific - Research Institute for Precision Machine Engineering (Центральный научно-исследовательский институт точного машиностроения).

TsNIITochMash determines the development of and develops small arms and simulators for them, individual field equipment, conducts R&D on control systems for precision-guided munitions (as well as protection against them), field artillery systems and new materials. It also develops most cartridges, from small arms up to 14.5×114mm, for the Russian Armed Forces.

Military products
 9×21mm Gyurza SR-1M Gyurza pistol, cartridges: SP-10, SP-11
  9×21mm Gyurza SR-2 Udav pistol, cartridges: SP-10, SP-11
 9×21mm Gyurza SR-2 Veresk submachine gun, cartridges:  SP-10, SP-11
 9×39mm SR-3 Vikhr compact assault rifle, cartridges: SP-5, SP-6
 9×39mm AS Val "special automatic rifle," cartridges:  SP-5, SP-6
 9×39mm VSS Vintorez "special sniper rifle," cartridges: SP-5, SP-6
 7.62×42mm PSS silenced pistol, cartridge: SP-4
 5.66×39mm APS Underwater Assault Rifle, cartridges: MPS, MPST
 4.5×40mmR SPP-1M Underwater pistol, cartridges: SPS
 9M113M SACLOS Anti-tank missile
 2S9 Nona
Zauralets-D

Concepts
 5.45×39mm AL-7 assault rifle
 5.45×39mm AO-63 assault rifle

Services

 State Demonstration-Test Center  - SDTC 	 
 Ordnance upgrade program for 120mm self-propelled Mortars  - Nona-SVK, and 2S31 Vena

See also
 List of Russian weaponry
 TsNIIMash

References

External links

Research institutes in the Soviet Union
Defence companies of the Soviet Union
Rostec
Companies based in Moscow Oblast